Apollo Yeri Ofwono (born April 14, 1962) is a Ugandan politician and a member of Ugandan parliament representing Tororo Municipality in Tororo District. He was elected to the parliament on the ticket of the National Resistance Movement (NRM). He is a member of the Natural Recourses and Appointments committee.

Life and education 
Ofwono is a Christian of Anglican denomination. He studied for a bachelor’s degree in Commerce at the Makerere University Business School.

Political career 
Ofwono first ran for his Tororo District seat in the Ugandan Parliament in 2006 but lose to incumbent MP Sanjay Tanna. Disatified, Ofwono challenged the result of the poll with allegations that his opponent bribed voters and brought in non-registered voters to vote him. He lose the case in court and was ordered to pay 44 million shillings in court cost. He failed to pay the fine until 2009 when he was arrested on the order of the court.

References 

Ugandan politicians
National Resistance Movement politicians
Ugandan Anglicans
Makerere University Business School alumni
1962 births
Living people